Gwiździny  is a village in the administrative district of Gmina Nowe Miasto Lubawskie, within Nowe Miasto County, Warmian-Masurian Voivodeship, in northern Poland.

During the Second World War it was the site of the Gwisdyn subcamp of the Nazi Stutthof concentration camp.

References

Villages in Nowe Miasto County
Holocaust locations in Poland